Residenz is a German word for "place of living", now obsolete except in the formal sense of an official residence. A related term, Residenzstadt, denotes a city where a sovereign ruler resided, therefore carrying a similar meaning as the modern expressions seat of government or capital. As there were many sovereign (imperially immediate) rulers in the Holy Roman Empire, ranking from Lord (Herr) to prince elector and king, there are many cities, palaces, and castles in this territory which used to be a residenz and are partially still so referred to today. The former residenz status of a city is frequently reflected by the architecture of its center. During the baroque period especially, many prestigious buildings were erected, sometimes even new towns were founded. Today, former Residenzstädte mostly still serve as cultural and administrative centers.

Examples of buildings or cities:
 
 
 Munich Residenz, the former residence of the monarchs of Bavaria. Munich remains capital of the German state of Bavaria.
 Würzburg Residenz, the former residence of the prince-bishops of Würzburg. Würzburg today is capital of the Lower Franconia government district of Bavaria.
 Alte Residenz, the former residence of the Archbishops of Salzburg. Salzburg today is capital of the Salzburg state of Austria.
 Prussia's three Residenzstädte, where, in theory at least, the royal family could live, were Berlin, Königsberg, and Breslau.

Residenzes newly founded in the baroque era:
 Louis William, Margrave of Baden-Baden, general field marshal of the Holy Roman Empire, nicknamed "Turk[s]-Louis" for his successes against the Turks and now in possession of a great war prize, in 1699 altered plans for a hunting lodge being built near the village of Rastatt since 1697. Aiming to become prince elector, he spent 12 million guilders on Rastatt Castle. The village grew accordingly and was incorporated as a town in 1700. Louis William lived at the castle from 1702, and the court followed from Baden in 1705.
 Eberhard Louis, Duke of Württemberg, had similarly in 1704 begun reconstruction of a destroyed hunting lodge north of his residenz of Stuttgart. In 1705, he named the site Ludwigsburg. Plans were enlarged in 1706 and again in 1715, resulting in Ludwigsburg Palace. In 1709, Eberhard Louis moved to the new castle. Beginning in the same year, a planned community was constructed near the palace, which was incorporated as a town in 1718. Ludwigsburg officially became the Württemberg residenz in 1718. After Eberhard Louis' death in 1733, his successor took the court back to Stuttgart. Once again from 1764 to 1775, Charles Eugene, in quarrelling with the duchy's estates over yet another residenz, the Stuttgart New Palace, moved the residenz to Ludwigsburg.
 In 1715, Margrave Charles William of Baden-Durlach chose to build a new residenz in a space in the woods he called Karlsruhe ("Charles' rest"). From 1717 on, Karlsruhe was residenz of Baden-Durlach, later of the grand duchy of Baden, and in 1719 the administration had been completely transferred from Durlach. After 1952, when the states of Baden and Württemberg were merged into Baden-Württemberg, the Württemberg capital Stuttgart becoming capital of the new state, Karlsruhe not only remained capital of a government district of the same name, but in compensation became "Residenz des Rechts" (residence of law) for all Germany, seating the Federal Constitutional Court and the Federal Court of Justice.
 Charles III Philip, Elector Palatine since 1716, in 1720 transferred his residenz from Heidelberg to Mannheim, a fort at the confluence of the rivers Rhine and Neckar, which had been destroyed in the war and was now being reconstructed. Construction of Mannheim Palace began in 1720 in place of the former citadel.